Església de Sant Miquel d'Engolasters  is a church located in Engolasters, Escaldes-Engordany Parish, Andorra. It is a heritage property registered in the Cultural Heritage of Andorra. It was built originally in the 11-12th century.

References

Escaldes-Engordany
Roman Catholic churches in Andorra
Cultural Heritage of Andorra